The 1937–38 season was Galatasaray SK's 34th in existence and the club's 26th consecutive season in the Istanbul Football League.

Squad statistics

Squad changes for the 1937–38 season
In:

Competitions

Istanbul Football League

Classification

Matches
Kick-off listed in local time (EEST)

İstanbul Shield

Matches

Milli Küme

Classification

Matches

Friendly Matches

References
 Atabeyoğlu, Cem. 1453–1991 Türk Spor Tarihi Ansiklopedisi. page(143-144).(1991) An Grafik Basın Sanayi ve Ticaret AŞ
 Tekil, Süleyman. Dünden bugüne Galatasaray, (1983), page(76-87, 117-120, 161-162, 183). Arset Matbaacılık Kol.Şti.
 Futbol vol.2. Galatasaray. pp. 564–565, 585. Tercüman Spor Ansiklopedisi. (1981)Tercüman Gazetecilik ve Matbaacılık AŞ.
 1938 Milli Küme Maçları. Türk Futbol Tarihi vol.1. page(80). (June 1992) Türkiye Futbol Federasyonu Yayınları.

External links
 Galatasaray Sports Club Official Website 
 Turkish Football Federation - Galatasaray A.Ş. 
 uefa.com - Galatasaray AŞ

Galatasaray S.K. (football) seasons
Turkish football clubs 1937–38 season
1930s in Istanbul
Galatasaray Sports Club 1937–38 season